This is a list of all video games by Saber Interactive.

Games published

References 

Saber Interactive